The United States solicitor of labor is the chief legal officer of the United States Department of Labor and the third-ranking officer of the department, behind the secretary of labor and deputy secretary of labor. The Office of the Solicitor has the second largest litigation department in the U.S. federal government, with about 500 lawyers in both national and regional offices. The Solicitor of Labor has independent authority to initiate lawsuits to enforce 180 federal workplace statutes. The position is a Presidential appointee requiring Senate confirmation, and is paid at Level IV of the Executive Schedule.

The Office of the Solicitor was established by the Organic Act of 1913, which separated the Department of Labor from the Department of Commerce and Labor, although a solicitor position for the combined department had existed since 1903. The solicitor of labor was originally located in the Department of Justice until it was transferred to the Department of Labor in 1933. In 1940, all Department attorneys and legal personnel were transferred to the supervision of the solicitor of labor. In the 1980s, the office attracted attention for delays in cases enforcing the Employee Retirement Income Security Act of 1974, and for not seeking the maximum compensation for back wages due under the Fair Labor Standards Act of 1938. In 2019, a memo directing lawyers to consult with agency heads before filing lawsuits against employers was criticized as ceding some of its authority to political appointees.

List 
The following people have held the office of Solicitor of Labor:

References 
 Seema Nanda (Nominee)

External links 
 

 United States Solicitor of Labor
American labor lawyers